Pascal-Alex Vincent is a French director, author of original work, screenwriter, and voice-over.

Biography 
After training, Vincent worked at Alive (in France) to distribute Japanese films.

Vincent started collaborating with Local Films (a French studio) in the early 2000s, where he directed six short films: Les résultats du bac (Final Exams), Far West, Hollywood malgré lui (Hollywood by accident), Bébé requin (Baby Shark), Candy Boy, and En attendant demain (While waiting for tomorrow). Important for the Director to show life as it is. And here, as before, raised the issue of sexual identity. Even in the seemingly innocuous animated film Candy Boy. The result of this collaboration was the collection video 6 histoires courtes de Pascal-Alex Vincent.

Now the director continues his work.

Filmography

Short films 
 1994: À quatre mains
 1998: Thomas trébuche (Tommy Trips)
 2001: Les résultats du bac (Final Exams)
 2003: Far West
 2004: Hollywood malgré lui (Hollywood by accident)
 2005: Bébé requin (Baby Shark)
 2007: Candy Boy
 2008: En attendant demain (While waiting for tomorrow)
 2009: En colo (At Summer Camp | Holiday Camp)
 2009: Tchernobyl
 2014: Avec mes plans réguliers, jai confiance

Feature film 
 2008: Donne-moi la main (Give Me Your Hand)

TV 
 2009: Adorama
 2013: Blow Up Arte: Im Sang-soo
 2014: Blow Up Arte: Kate Bush et le cinéma (Blow Up auf ARTE: Kate Bush und der film)

Documentary films 
 2010: Miwa, à la recherche du lézard noir (Miwa, a Japanese Icon)
 2013: Mon quartier c'est...
 2021: Satoshi Kon: The Illusionist

Music clips 
 2011: The Princess and the Pea (Family of the Year, clip)
 2011: Darwin smiles (Kill the Young, clip)
 2012: Assassin (War in the Bed, clip)
 2012: Mohammed (War in the Bed, clip)
 2013: Far away now (Dead Rock Machine, clip)
 2014: Cowboy disease (Hamster's Shower, clip)
 2015: Poopsie Q (Eponymous Anonymous, clip)
 2015: Psilocybe (Psilocybe, clip)
 2015: Fairy (Diamond Fizz, clip)

External links

References 

French directors
French screenwriters
1967 births
Living people
People from Montargis